XHITS-FM is a radio station in Monterrey, Nuevo León. Broadcasting on 106.1 FM, XHITS is owned by Multimedios Radio and carries a pop format known as Hits FM.

History
The concession history for XHITS begins as XHMNR-FM, awarded to Roberto Torres García in 1992.

In 1999, Multimedios Radio bought XHMNR and immediately moved the XHITS callsign and format from 103.7 FM to this station.

References

Spanish-language radio stations
Radio stations in Monterrey
Multimedios Radio